Banting Memorial High School is a public secondary institution serving grades 9–12, located in Alliston, Ontario, Canada. It is part of the Simcoe County District School Board and has a student population of 1370. The principal is Nancy Arnold-Sallows.

The school is named in honour of Sir Frederick Grant Banting, a key member of the Canadian scientific team that discovered how to extract and use insulin for treating diabetes mellitus. Alliston, Ontario, Canada was the home town of Sir Frederick Banting, and is also the foundation of his homestead. Banting Memorial offers attending students programs in Extended French courses and Specialist High Skills Major in Health & Wellness, Horticulture & Landscaping, Agriculture, and Transportation. The school participates in county sporting events under the name of the "Marauders". The school serves students residing in Alliston, Beeton, Tottenham, Hockley Valley and Adjala Township.

As of 2018 the school board has recognized Banting Memorial as a priority school due to aging infrastructure, current recommendations are in place to renovate or rebuild the school building.

Feeder schools

 Alliston Union PS
 Adjala Central PS
 Baxter Central PS
 Boyne River PS
 Cookstown Central PS
 Ernest Cumberland ES
 Tecumseth Beeton PS
 Tecumseth South PS
 Tottenham PS

Schools with similar names
 Banting and Best Public School in Toronto, Ontario
 Frederick Banting Secondary Alternate Program in Ottawa, Ontario
 Sir Frederick Banting Secondary School in London, Ontario

See also
List of high schools in Ontario

References

External links
Banting Memorial High School
Simcoe County District School Board

High schools in Simcoe County
Educational institutions in Canada with year of establishment missing